Harriet Smith O'Neill (born April 20, 1957) is a retired associate justice of the Supreme Court of Texas. A Republican, O'Neill represented Place 3 of the nine positions on the court. O'Neill's term was to expire on December 31, 2010, and she declined to seek re-election to a third full six-year term. In the April 13 Republican runoff election, Judge Debra Lehrmann, a family court jurist from Fort Worth, defeated Rick Green, a former state legislator and Constitutional speaker from Dripping Springs. O'Neill subsequently decided to leave the court early and vacated the seat on June 20, 2010.  Lehrmann was appointed by Governor Rick Perry to fill out O'Neill's term.

Judicial experience
O'Neill was first elected to the Texas Supreme Court in 1998.  Previously, O'Neill had been a justice of the Fourteenth Court of Appeals of Texas since 1995, when then-Governor George W. Bush appointed her. Prior to that, O'Neill had been a trial judge for the 152nd District Court, located in Houston, to which she was elected in 1992.

Education and career
O'Neill completed her undergraduate studies at Converse College and she received her J.D. from the University of South Carolina School of Law in 1982.  Prior to joining the bench, O'Neill was in private practice in Houston.  She practiced law with the firms of Porter & Clements, Morris & Campbell, and then opened her own practice.  Throughout those ten years, O'Neill practiced mostly complex business and commercial litigation.

References

Law Office of Harriet O'Neill

External links
 Law Office of Harriet O'Neill
 Justice O'Neill's profile online at the Texas Supreme Court website

Justices of the Texas Supreme Court
American women judges
University of South Carolina alumni
Living people
People from Houston
People from Austin, Texas
1957 births
Texas lawyers
Texas Republicans
21st-century American women
20th-century American women judges
20th-century American judges
21st-century American women judges
21st-century American judges